In the mathematical field of graph theory, the Harries graph or Harries (3-10)-cage is a 3-regular, undirected graph with 70 vertices and 105 edges.

The Harries graph has chromatic number 2, chromatic index 3, radius 6, diameter 6, girth 10 and is Hamiltonian. It is also a 3-vertex-connected and 3-edge-connected, non-planar, cubic graph. It has book thickness 3 and queue number 2.

The characteristic polynomial of the Harries graph is

History
In 1972, A. T. Balaban published a (3-10)-cage graph, a cubic graph that has as few vertices as possible for girth 10. It was the first (3-10)-cage discovered but it was not unique.

The complete list of (3-10)-cage and the proof of minimality was given by O'Keefe and Wong in 1980. There exist three distinct (3-10)-cage graphs—the Balaban 10-cage, the Harries graph and the Harries–Wong graph. Moreover, the Harries–Wong graph and Harries graph are cospectral graphs.

Gallery

References 

Individual graphs
Regular graphs